Dru Hill is the debut studio album from American boy band Dru Hill, released November 19, 1996 on Island Records. The album featured four singles "Tell Me", "In My Bed", "Never Make A Promise" and "5 Steps". All of the singles had music videos released. The album also features the So So Def remix of "In My Bed", which features Jermaine Dupri and Da Brat, as a bonus track, which also had a music video released.

The album peaked at number twenty-three on the Billboard 200 chart. By June 1997 it was certified platinum in sales by the RIAA, after sales exceeding 1,000,000 copies in the United States.

Overview
All of the songs on the album are performed by Sisqó, Nokio, Jazz and Woody. Sisqó sings solo on the tracks "In My Bed", "Love's Train" and "Share My World", Jazz sings solo on "Never Make A Promise" and Woody sings solo on "April Showers". Nokio has no solos and is featured on "Satisfied" & "All Alone" which all of the members perform on both.

Release and reception
The album peaked at twenty-three on the U.S. Billboard 200 and reached the fifth spot on the R&B Albums chart. The album was certified gold in February 1997 and platinum by June of the same year. Rob Theakston of Allmusic called the album "an impressive debut and a razor-sharp clue of the great things to come."

Track listing

Charts

Weekly charts

Year-end charts

Certifications

Personnel
Information taken from Allmusic.
assistant engineering – Jim Carliana, Chris Habeck, Kevin Lively, Steven Rhodes, Brian Thomas, Bernasky Wall, Won B., Luke Yeager
assistant mixing – Steve Jones, Mike Rew, Gordon Rice, Paul Smith
associate production – A. Islam Haqq, Ralph Stacy
bass – Ronnie Garrett, Lance Hiesman, Zachary Scott, Nate Clemons
drum programming – Michael Aharon, Big Mike Clemons, Daryl Simmons, Allen "Grip" Smith
drums – Nathaniel Townsley
engineering – Won Allen, Mike Anzel, Brian Frye, Larry Gold, Karl Heilbron, David Kennedy, Thom "TK" Kidd, Chris Lighty, Alex Nesmith, Jon Smeltz, Mike Tarsia
executive production – Hiriam Hicks, Haqq Islam, Kevin Peck
grooming – William Marshall
guitar – Fred Campbell
keyboard programming – Bobby Crawford, Allen "Grip" Smith
keyboards – Stanley Brown, Kim Jordan, Benjamin Love, Daryl Simmons, Allen "Grip" Smith
mastering – Chris Gehringer
mixing – John Anthony, Chris Barnett, Russell Elevado, Jon Gass, Gerhard Joost, Darryl Pearson, Mike Tarsia
multi-instruments – Nate "Phenomenal" Clemons, Ralph Stacy
overdubs – Anthony Duino, Russell Elevado
percussion – Spike
photography – Guzman (Constance Hansen & Russell Peacock)
production – Andre Bell, Stanley Brown, Terence Dudley, A. Islam Haqq, Benjamin Love, Nokio the N-Tity, Tim Dawg, Darryl Pearson, Daryl Simmons, Allen "Grip" Smith, Keith Sweat, Janice Upchurch
production coordination – Ivy Skoff
programming – Tom Salta
rapping – Triip
string arranging – Michael Aharon
stylist – Nadia Bartos
vocal arranging – Darryl Pearson, Sisqó
vocals (background) – James "Woody" Green

Notes

External links
 
 Dru Hill at Discogs

1996 debut albums
Dru Hill albums
Island Records albums